The 2017 FIM Moto3 World Championship was a part of the 69th F.I.M. Road Racing World Championship season.

Brad Binder was the reigning series champion but did not defend his title as he joined the series' intermediate class, Moto2.

The riders' championship title was won by Leopard Racing rider Joan Mir with 10 victories and 13 podiums finishes.

Calendar
The following Grands Prix were scheduled to take place in 2017.

 ‡ = Night race

Calendar changes
 The Austrian and Czech Republic Grand Prix swapped places, with the Czech Republic hosting the tenth round, while Austria hosts the eleventh round.
 The British Grand Prix was scheduled to move from Silverstone to the new Circuit of Wales, but construction on the new track had not commenced. The two circuits reached a deal that would have seen Silverstone continue to host the British Grand Prix in 2017, with an option to host the 2018 race.

Teams and riders

A provisional list of team entrants for 2017 was released on 26 October 2016. All teams used Dunlop tyres.

Rider changes
 After spending two seasons as a replacement rider, Lorenzo Dalla Porta has made his full season debut with Pull & Bear Aspar Mahindra Team, filling in the seat vacated by Francesco Bagnaia who moves up to Moto2.
 Romano Fenati, who was fired from Valentino Rossi's team Sky Racing Team VR46 midway through last season due to behavioral issues, landed a ride with Snipers Team for the 2017 season.
 Niccolò Antonelli left Ongetta-Rivacold (now called Snipers Team) to join Red Bull KTM Ajo, replacing Brad Binder who moves up to Moto2
 Enea Bastianini moved to Estrella Galicia 0,0, filling in the seat vacated by Jorge Navarro who moves up to Moto2, with Jorge Martín replacing Bastianini in Gresini Racing Moto3.
 John McPhee moved to a brand new UK-based team backed by Dorna, GB Team with Jakub Kornfeil replacing him at Peugeot MC Saxoprint.
 María Herrera has moved to AGR Team, who decided to field one bike in Moto3. Herrera previously rode for her own team in 2016 after taking over the assets of Team Laglisse.
 Tony Arbolino has made his Moto3 debut with the new Moto3 team SIC58 Squadra Corse, having rode for the team in 2016 FIM CEV Moto3 Junior World Championship.
 2016 Red Bull MotoGP Rookies Cup Champion, Ayumu Sasaki set to make his Moto3 debut with SIC Racing Team, filling the seat vacated by Jakub Kornfeil.
 After spending the previous season as a replacement rider for Peugeot MC Saxoprint, Albert Arenas makes his full season debut with Aspar Team Moto3, filling the seat vacated by Jorge Martin.
 Tatsuki Suzuki moved to the new team SIC58 Squadra Corse, with both Marco Bezzecchi and Manuel Pagliani set to make their Moto3 full season debut, filling in the two seats vacated by Suzuki and Fabio Spiranelli at CIP-Unicom Starker.
 Patrik Pulkkinen made his Moto3 debut, joining Peugeot MC Saxoprint.
 Livio Loi moved to Leopard Racing, filling in the seat vacated by both Fabio Quartararo and Andrea Locatelli who moved up to Moto2
 Both Kaito Toba and Nakarin Atiratphuvapat set to make their Moto3 debut with Honda Team Asia, being promoted from Asia Talent Team Academy after Hiroki Ono left the team and Khairul Idham Pawi got promoted to Moto2
 Enzo Boulom, who was on the provisional entry list as Wildcard & Replacement Rider, withdrew from the championship.

Team changes
 Paolo Simoncelli's team SIC58 Squadra Corse made their Moto3 debut, fielding two Honda NSF250RWs for Tony Arbolino and Tatsuki Suzuki.
 3570 Team Italia left Moto3 for the Supersport 300 World Championship.
 After spending the previous season in Moto3, RW Racing GP BV switched to Moto2.
 AGR Team fielded one bike in Moto3, after spending the previous season in Moto2 with two bikes.
 After entering the 2016 season with three bikes, both Leopard Racing and Sky Racing Team VR46 reverted to two bikes in 2017.
 After spending the previous season with Mahindra, Platinum Bay Real Estate changed bikes to KTM.
 Ongetta-Rivacold changed their name to Snipers Team, with Marinelli Rivacold as their main sponsor.

Mid-season changes
 Danny Kent returned to Moto3 after leaving Kiefer Racing in Moto2. After joining Red Bull KTM Ajo as a wildcard at the French GP, at Germany, Kent also replaced Niccolò Antonelli at the same team.
 Darryn Binder was replaced by Dennis Foggia at the Czech GP. Jaume Masiá replaced him for 3 rounds.
 AGR Team folded its operations in both Moto2 and Moto3 following the Aragon GP due to financial issues coupled with poor performance throughout the 2017 season. For the Australian and Malaysian rounds, María Herrera replaced Albert Arenas at the Aspar team. At the Valencia GP, Arenas returned.

Results and standings

Grands Prix

Riders' standings
Scoring system
Points were awarded to the top fifteen finishers. A rider had to finish the race to earn points.

Constructors' standings
Points were awarded to the top fifteen finishers. A rider had to finish the race to earn points.

 Each constructor got the same number of points as their best placed rider in each race.

Notes

References

Moto3
Grand Prix motorcycle racing seasons